Anders Winroth (born 1965 in Ludvika in Sweden) is a professor of medieval history at the University of Oslo and previously taught in the same field at Yale University

Life
After graduation from Stockholm University, Winroth did his master's and doctoral studies at Columbia University under Robert Somerville, followed by postdoctoral research at the University of Newcastle, where he was the Sir James Knott Research Fellow and worked with R. I. Moore.

Professor Winroth specializes in the history  of "medieval Europe, especially religious, intellectual and legal history as well as the Viking Age. He teaches both halves of the survey lecture course in medieval history, seminars in religious, legal, intellectual, and Scandinavian history." 

He worked on the Decretum Gratiani of Gratian and discovered that the original version, the so-called "first recension," was only about half the size of the commonly known text. Winroth also has a strong interest in Swedish genealogy.

Winroth was a 2003 MacArthur Fellow.

He is married to medievalist Jóhanna Katrín Friðriksdóttir. She works for the National Library of Norway and is known for her scholarship on women in the Viking world.

Works

References

External links
Winroth's personal web site
Winroth's university web page

1965 births
Living people
Columbia University alumni
MacArthur Fellows
20th-century Swedish historians
Swedish medievalists
Fellows of the Medieval Academy of America
21st-century Swedish historians
Academic staff of the University of Oslo